Sulima is a surname. It may refer to:

 Alyaksandr Sulima (born 1979), Belarusian footballer
 George Sulima (1928–1987), American football player
 Ivan Sulima, Ukrainian Cossack leader
 Jan Sulima, pseudonym of Josef Szulc (1875–1956), Polish-French composer
 Nikolai Sulima (1777–1840), Russian general
 Stefan Sulima, pseudonym of Władysław Ogrodziński, Polish historian and writer
 Stefan Sulima-Popiel (1896–1927), Polish footballer
 Vladimir Sulima (1946–1968), Soviet murderer

See also